Ghost Game is a novel by British author Nigel Hinton which was first published in 2011. It is part of Heinemann's Heroes series which is designed to appeal to reluctant readers in the schools market. It follows the story of a father and son who start a new life in a new town after the loss of the mother and younger son of the family but Danny believed that their temporary house was haunted by a boss from his late brother's favourite video game. A non fiction section by Christopher Lee about ghosts follows the story.

Concept
When the author was approached by Pearson PLC to contribute to the Heroes series he thought about the violent books on the market and wanted to write something powerful and dramatic. It is also inspired by Hinton's nephew Joey Lager, to whom the novel is dedicated, playing video games.

References

External links
 Article of the book on Pearson's Heroes series website

2011 British novels
Heinemann (publisher) books
Novels by Nigel Hinton